The Khulna Division is the second largest of the eight divisions of Bangladesh. Its headquarters and largest city is Khulna city in Khulna District.

History 
In British Raj Khulna Division was a part of Presidency division. Before 1947 The Presidency division had six major districts, Howrah, Calcutta, 24 Parganas, Khulna, undivided Jessore, & undivided Nadia. In 1947 The Partition of India is divided this division into two. The district of Khulna and the lion half of Jessore District and Nadia District become part of Newly established East Bengal. And rest of the district of the Presidency division become part of West Bengal. In 1948 The lion half Nadia district of East Bengal formed a new  Kushtia District. And the govt of East Bengal added the Jessore , Khulna & Kushtia district into Rajshahi Division. After in 1960 the govt of East Pakistan , This three district from  Rajshahi Division and one district from Dacca Division create new Division of Khulna. In 1993 the Barisal Division is formed from Khulna division.

Geography 
The Khulna division borders to India by Presidency division of Indian State of West Bengal to the west, the Rajshahi Division to the north, the Dhaka division  and the Barisal division to the east, and has a coastline on the Bay of Bengal to the south. It is part of the Ganges River delta or Greater Bengal Delta. Other rivers include the Madhumati River, the Bhairab River and the Kapotaksha River . The region also includes several islands in the Bay of Bengal.

The Sundarbans, the world's largest mangrove forest, is in the southern part of the delta.Khulna is in the northern part of the district, and the Mayur River is the western boundary of the metropolitan area.

Administrative districts 
The division was formed in 1960.
Khulna Division consists of the following ten districts (zilas), subdivided into 59 sub-districts (upazilas):

Economy 
Most parts of the largest mangrove forest in the world — the Sundarban — is spread over the three most southerly districts of Satkhira, Khulna and Bagherhat.

Education 
The division contains educational institutions including:

Universities

Public Universities
 Khulna University
 Khulna University of Engineering and Technology
 Khulna Agricultural University
 Sheikh Hasina Medical University
 Jashore University of Science and Technology
 Islamic University, Bangladesh
 Mujibnagar University,Mujibnagar Upazila
Private Universities
 North Western University, Bangladesh
 Northern University of Business & Technology Khulna
 Rabindra Maitree University, Kushtia
 Lalon Science and Arts University, Kushtia

Medical schools
Public
 Khulna Medical College
 Kushtia Medical College
 Jashore Medical College
 Satkhira Medical College
 Magura Medical College
 Army Medical College, Jashore

Private
 Khulna City Medical College Hospital
 Gazi Medical College
 Ad-Din Akij Medical College & Hospital, Khulna
 Khulna Homeopathic Medical College
 Ad-Din Sakina Medical College & Hospital , Jashore
 Selima Medical College & Hospital, Kushtia

Colleges
 Ahsanullah College,Khulna
 Kushtia Government College
 Khulna Collectorate Public School & College
 Kushtia Government Central College  
 Kushtia Government Womens College  
 Police Lines School and College, Kushtia  
 Khulna Govt. Model School and college,khulna
 Kushtia Islamia College,
 Kumarkhali Govt. College, Kushtia
 Bheramara Govt. College, Kushtia
 Bheramara Govt. Womens College, Kushtia
 Chuadanga Govt College-Chuadanga  
 Government B L College , Khulna
 Khulna Public College
 Jhenaidah Cadet College
 Majid Memorial City College, Khulna
 Cantonment College, Jashore
 Azam Khan Govt. Commerce College, Khulna
 BN School & College, Khulna
 Govt. H.S.S College, Magura
 Michael Modhushudon College, Jashore
 Govt. Pioneer Woman's College, South-Central Road, Khulna
 Khulna Govt. Girls College
 Govt. Sundarban Adarsha College. Khulna
 Govt. K.C. College, Jhenaidah
 Government P.C. College, Bagerhat
 Daulatpur College (Day/Night), Daulatpur, Khulna
 Govt. Keshabpur College, Keshabpur, Jashore
 Khan Jahan Ali Ideal College
 Chuknagor College, Dumuria, Khulna
 Dr. Abdur Razzak Municipal College
 BAF Shaheen college ,Jashore
 Jashore Govt. City college
 Dawood Public School, Jashore
 Adarsha Degree College, Magura
 Sreepur Degree College, Magura
 

Polytechnic institutes
 Khulna Polytechnic Institute
 Jashore Polytechnic Institute
 City Polytechnic Institute, Khulna
 Mangrove Institute of Science and Technology
 North South Polytechnic Institute Khulna
 Jhenaidah Polytechnic Institute
 Khanjahan Ali college of Engineering and Technology
 BCMC College of Engineering & Technology
 Khulna Mohila Polytechnic Institute
 Kushtia Polytechnic Institute
 Satkhira Polytechnic Institute
 Magura Polytechnic  Institute

 Schools
 V J Govt High School, Chuadanga
 Chuadanga Govt Girls' High School-Chuadanga  
 Govt. Coronation Girls' High School-khulna
 Islamabad Collegiate School
 Dighalia M.A. Majid Secondary School, Khulna
 Jashore Zilla School
 Khulna Zilla School
 Kushtia Zilla School
 Fatima Girls High School, Khulna
 Jashore Cantonment Public School
 Keshabpur Pilot School & College, Jashore
 Khulna Collegiate Girls School
 Khulna Engineering University School
 Khulna Lions Schools
 Adarsho Girls' School, Keshabpur, Jashore
 Sagardari Michael Madhusudan Institution, Keshabpur, Jashore 
 Kumira High School
 M.M. High School
 Mangolkot M.L High School, Keshabpur, Jashore
 Rev. Paul High School
 Rosedale International School
 Rotary School, Khalishpur, Khulna
 S.B.S.N, Damoder
 St. Joseph's High School, Khulna
 St. Xavier's High School, Khulna
 Udayan Khulna Zilla Police School

Other educational institutes
Khulna has six integrated general and vocational (IGV) schools and one technical school of UCEP (Underprivileged Children's Educational Programs), which is a non-profitable organization.
 UCEP Mohsin Khulna TVET Institute, Baikali, Khulna
 UCEP Mohsin Khulna Technical School, Baikali,
 UCEP Sonadanga Technical School, Sonadanga
 UCEP M.A Majid Technical School, Fulbarigate
 UCEP Khalishpur Technical School, Khalishpur
 UCEP Johara Samad Technical School, Tootpara
 UCEP Wazed Ali Technical School, Banorgati

The technical school is Khulna Mohsin Technical School, which is situated at 7, Junction Road, Baikali, Khulna.

Kushtia Zilla School, Kushtia is one of the best schools in Khulna division. In higher secondary level Kushtia Govt. College, Kushtia is playing the same role as KZS, and thus in Khulna division education level increasing day by day.

Transportation 
Khulna Division has highest transportation link with other area in Bangladesh as well as with India by Road, Rail , Air and Waterways

Road 
The national highway (N7)  cross through Khulna Division which is connected Dhaka To  Port of Mongla.  The AH1 and AH41 also Cross through  Khulna division. It also connect with India By Port of Benapole, Port of Dorshona , Port Of Mujibnogor, Port Of Bhomra through various  Road link.

Rail 
There are several Railway route in Khulna Division which Connect various city of Bangladesh.  It has also 2 international route which connect India  by train.

Air 
There are two airport in Khulna Division. One of them is functional and one under construction. The Jashore Airport is the functional airport in Khulna Division which connect Dhaka , Chattogram  and Cox Bazar By air. And the Khan Jahan Ali International Airport is now under construction.

Waterways 
Port of Khulna, Port of Khustia, Port of Noapara are the main three river port in Khulna division. Every day various ship are leaving from thus port to various part of Bangladesh.

Port of Mongla is the solo sea port in Khulna division.

Newspapers and magazines 
Daily and weekly newspapers are published from Khulna Division, including:
 Anirbhan
 Janmobhumi
 Khulna News
 Lok Samaj
 Probaho
 Purbanchal
 satkhiranews.com
 The Daily Gramer Kagoj
 The Daily Spandan
 Tribune

Points of interest 
Sixty Dome Mosque - Situated in the suburbs of Bagerhat, at the meeting-point of the Ganges and Brahmaputra rivers, this ancient city, formerly known as Khalifatabad, was founded by the Turkish general Ulugh Khan Jahan in the 15th century. The city's infrastructure reveals considerable technical skill and an exceptional number of mosques and early Islamic monuments, many built of brick, can be seen there.

The Sundarbans mangrove forest, one of the largest such forests in the world (140,000 ha), lies on the delta of the Ganges, Brahmaputra and Meghna rivers on the Bay of Bengal. It is adjacent to the border of India's Sundarbans World Heritage site inscribed in 1987. The site is intersected by a complex network of tidal waterways, mudflats and small islands of salt-tolerant mangrove forests, and presents an excellent example of ongoing ecological processes. The area is known for its wide range of fauna, including 260 bird species, the Bengal tiger and other threatened species such as the estuarine crocodile and the Indian python.

Lalon is Bengali Baul saint. Lalon Shah was a songwriter, social reformer, and thinker.  He is most popular as Lalon Shah or Lalon Fakir. He wrote many songs, and these songs are known as Lalon Geeti. Fakir Lalon was born in 1774 and died on 17 October 1890 in Kushtia district, Bangladesh. He is known as the Baul Samrat.

Shilaidaha Kuthibadi is a place in Kumarkhali Upazila of Kushtia District in Bangladesh. The place is famous for Kuthi Bari; a country house made by Dwarkanath Tagore. Rabindranath Tagore lived a part of life here and created some of his memorable poems while living here.

1971: Genocide-Torture Archive & Museum - Rare pictures and paintings depicting the genocide of Bangalees by the Pakistan army hang on the wall. There is also a rich collection of books and audio-visual materials on the ruthless massacre against the unarmed people. The aim of the museum is to educate people, especially youths, about the genocide committed by the Pakistan army in association with their local collaborators, said Prof Muntassir Mamoon, chairman of the trustee board that runs the institution.

Language 
Bengali is the widely spoken language in Khulna division.

Notable persons

 Khan Jahan Ali- Saint
 Fakir Lalon Shah - Baul legend
 Prafulla Chandra Ray - Acharya and scholar of University of Dhaka
 Michael Madhusudan Datta - Poet and dramatist
 Nilima Ibrahim - Educationist, littérateur and social worker
 Firoz Mahmud - Contemporary visual artist & painter
 Mohammad Lutfur Rahman - Author
 Tanvir Mokammel - Filmmaker and writer
 Pramatha Chaudhuri - Essayist, poet, author & editor
 Farrukh Ahmad - Poet & editor
 Qazi Imdadul Haq – Writer
 Nur Mohammad Sheikh - EPR, Bir Sreshtho
 Sheikh Abu Naser - Politician
 Abdul Hyee -  Politician (Jhenaidah), freedom fighter and commander during the Bangladesh Liberation War
 SM Shafiuddin Ahmed - 17th Chief of Army Staff (CAS) of Bangladesh Army
 Mashrafe Mortaza - Cricketer & Member of Parliament (Narail-2)
 Bishnu Chattopadhyay - Freedom fighter and leader of peasant movement
 Dr. Jamal Nazrul Islam - Physicist
 Ahmed Ali Enayetpuri - Islamic scholar and Member of the Bengal Legislative Assembly
 Syed Ali Ahsan - Poet
 Shakib Al Hasan - Cricketer
 Manjural Islam Rana - Cricketer (Died by Accident)
 Dinesh Chandra Chattopadhyay - Writer and editor
 Suvra Mukherjee - Former first lady of India, wife of President Pranab Mukherjee
 Bobita - Actress
 Haridasa Thakur - Great Vaisnava Saint, acarya of the Holy Name.
 Muhammad Sohrab Hossain - Former Minister, People's Republic of Bangladesh
 Soumya Sarkar - Cricketer
 Imrul Kayes - Cricketer
 Habibul Bashar - Cricketer
 Mustafizur Rahman - Cricketer
 Abdur Razzak (cricketer) - Cricketer
 Mohammad Manjural Islam - Cricketer
 Sheikh Salahuddin - Cricketer And Coach (BCB Academy)
 Syed Rasel - Cricketer
 S. I. Tutul - Singer
 Munshi Mohammad Meherullah - Muslim poet, religious leader
 Gangadhar Sen Roy - Ayurveda physician
 Sheikh Razzak Ali - Lawyer, politician, Deputy Speaker and Speaker of Bangladesh Jatiyo Sangsad
 Salma Khatun - Cricketer
 Jahanara Alam -  Cricketer
 Rumana Ahmed - Cricketer
 Mehedi Hasan (Miraz) - Cricketer
 Puja Cherry Roy - Actress
 Afif Hossain - Cricketer
 Nurul Hasan Sohan - Cricketer
 Ayasha Rahman - Cricketer
 Shukhtara Rahman - Cricketer
 Tahin Tahera - Cricketer
 Shaila Sharmin - Cricketer
 Ziaur Rahman - Cricketer
 Radhabinod Pal - Jurist, dissenting judge at the Tokyo Trials
 Abdul Hakeem (speaker) - former speaker of the East Bengal Legislative Assembly

References

Khulna Division
Divisions of Bangladesh
Western Bengal